Peyerimhoffiella is a genus of fungi in the family Laboulbeniaceae. A monotypic genus, it contains the single species Peyerimhoffiella elegans.

References

External links
Peyerimhoffiella at Index Fungorum

Laboulbeniomycetes
Monotypic Laboulbeniomycetes genera